Faicchio is a small village in the Province of Benevento in the Italian region Campania, located about 50 km northeast of Naples and about 30 km northwest of Benevento.

Faicchio borders the following villages: Cusano Mutri, Gioia Sannitica, Puglianello, Ruviano, San Lorenzello, San Salvatore Telesino.

Faicchio is located a few km from the famous Terme di Telese.

History

Going back to the 15th century and subsequently reconstructed Castelo Ducale it is situated in Piazza Roma, in the centre of the town, The Lombards (7th – 10th century AD) held the castle. After the Lombard rule the Normans ruled Faicchio and its surroundings. At that time the Castle was built or rebuilt in 1135 by Sanframondo, new masters of the place.

During 1300, the castle was restored and expanded upon.  Sanframondo, put the castle on for sale.  In 1337, it came into the hands of the family Monsorio until 1520. Monsorio, with the air of the early Renaissance, Faicchio entered into an era of fifteenth-century architecture.

In 1612 Neapolitan Gabriele De Martino restored the castle to what can be seen today. Another final restoration occurred in 1962. The building is shaped like an irregular polygon whose sides are connected together by three towers. The structure recalls the famous "big brother" of Naples, namely the Angevin. The towers, in fact, albeit in low proportions, are based on a truncated conical bases such as the castle in Naples.

The convent of San Pasquale sits above Faicchio. The convent and church of San Salvatore Saviour dates back to 1589 and consisted of five altars. The monastery has also hosted, in past years, a recovery house for drug addicts. There is a valuable library containing migliaglia volumes.
Faicchio is full of ancient churches. The village also has got a very rich nature, with two mountains, Monte Acero and Monte Erbano, the southern border of Matese. It is considered as one of the most beautiful village in South Italy.

Notable people
Eugenio Bianchi, theoretical physicist born in Faicchio 
Luigi Palmieri, physicist, meteorologist, politician born in Faicchio and died in Naples.
Clotilde Micheli, foundress of the Sisters of the Angels. She witnessed Martin Luther surrounded by terrible demons. Micheli died on 24 March 1911. Her remains are interred in Faicchio.

References

Cities and towns in Campania